The 2022 Africa Men's Sevens are an annual African rugby sevens tournament that took place at the Kyadondo Rugby Club, Kampala between 23 and 24 April 2022; they were held in Uganda for the second time. The top three teams qualified for the 2022 Rugby World Cup Sevens in Cape Town, and the top two teams qualified to the 2022 World Rugby Sevens Challenger Series. In addition, the top two Commonwealth teams not already qualified for the 2022 Commonwealth Games via the World Rugby Sevens Series booked their places in Birmingham.

Fourteen teams participated in the tournament, including 2019 champions Kenya.

Format
Teams are seeded according to their performances in the previous championship and regional qualifiers. First-round results determine whether they advance to the Cup pools (for the top eight teams) or the Trophy pools (for the other six teams).

In the Cup competition, the top two teams in each pool advance to the semi-finals (and final / third-place match thereafter). The third-placed teams in each pool contest a fifth-place match, with all other teams (including those in the Trophy competition) given a final ranking after the pool stage since the competition was delayed by inclement weather on the morning of the second day.

Teams 
The following teams participated in the tournament, seeded as follows:

Tournament play
All times in East Africa Time (UTC+03:00)

Opening round

The teams were allocated to pools according to the above results:

 Pool A: Winners of matches 1, 4, and 5, and the losing team with the smallest losing margin
 Pool B: Winners of matches 2, 3, 6, and 7
 Pool C: The losing teams with the 2nd, 5th, and 6th smallest losing margins
 Pool D: The losing teams with the 3rd, 4th, and 7th smallest losing margins

Pool stage

Pool A (Cup)

Pool B (Cup)

Pool C (Trophy)

Pool D (Trophy)

Knockout stage (Cup only)

Semi-finals

Fifth-place match

Third-place match

Final

Final standings

Note

See also
 2021–22 World Rugby Sevens Series

References

External links
 Tournament site

 

2022
2022 rugby sevens competitions
2022 in African rugby union
2022 in Ugandan sport
April 2022 sports events in Africa
Africa Men's Sevens